Plusilla is a monotypic moth genus of the family Noctuidae. Its only species, Plusilla rosalia, is found in south-east Siberia, Korea and Japan. Both the genus and species were first described by Staudinger in 1892.

References

Hadeninae
Monotypic moth genera